Michael J. Murphy (1897 – 18 October 1955) was an Irish hurler who played as a goalkeeper for the Limerick senior team.

Born in Limerick, Murphy first played competitive hurling in his youth. He made his first impression on the inter-county scene when he joined the Limerick senior team during a golden age between 1918 and 1923. Murphy went on to play a key role for Limerick for over a decade, and won two All-Ireland medals and two Munster medals.

As a member of the Munster inter-provincial team on two occasions, Murphy won one Railway Cup medal. At club level he is a five-time championship medallist with Young Irelands. Murphy also lined out with St. Patrick's.

Honours

Player

Young Irelands
Limerick Senior Club Hurling Championship (5): 1920, 1922, 1928, 1930, 1932

Limerick
All-Ireland Senior Hurling Championship (2): 1918, 1921
Munster Senior Hurling Championship (2): 1918, 1921

Munster
Railway Cup (1): 1928

References

1897 births
1955 deaths
Young Irelands (Limerick) hurlers
Limerick inter-county hurlers
Munster inter-provincial hurlers
Hurling goalkeepers
All-Ireland Senior Hurling Championship winners
Sportspeople from Limerick (city)